Boomer is a farming community located in Wilkes County, North Carolina. Legally it is a township, a non-governmental county subdivision. The population was 1,266 at the 2020 Census.

History
The community was named after its first postmaster, Ed "Boomer" Matheson. The community was originally called Warrior Creek, after a stream which flows through the area. Boomer was the birthplace and home of James Larkin Pearson, a poet and newspaper publisher who served as North Carolina Poet Laureate from 1953 to 1981. The ZIP Code for Boomer is 28606.

Geography
Boomer is located 36.067N, 81.253W. Boomer has an elevation of 1,243 feet above sea level. The community is located in the foothills of the Brushy Mountains, an isolated spur of the Blue Ridge Mountains to the west.

References

Townships in Wilkes County, North Carolina
Townships in North Carolina